Chevron Science Center is a landmark academic building at 219 Parkman Avenue in Pittsburgh, Pennsylvania, United States on the campus of the University of Pittsburgh.   The 15-story facility, completed in 1974, was designed by Kuhn, Newcomer & Valentour and houses the university's chemistry department. A three-story addition above Ashe Auditorium was completed in 2011.

History

Between 1910 and 1971, the site of Chevron Science Center had been occupied by the former State Hall, the first building erected upon Pitt's move in the early 20th century to the Oakland campus and at various times home to the university's library, administration, and engineering department. Chevron Science Center's $14.7 million cost ($ million today) was partially offset by a $2 million grant ($ million today) from the National Science Foundation. Its completion brought together under one roof many chemistry facilities that were, at the time, scattered among eight different buildings on Pitt's campus. Upon its completion, it was the largest school building for chemistry instruction and research east of the Mississippi River.  The building also received a second place award in the "Lab of the Year" contest conducted by Industrial Research magazine. It contains a 500-seat auditorium dedicated to Lauren H. Ashe, a 1914 Pitt alumnus who was a pioneer in the pharmaceutical industry.

The building was named in recognition of Chevron Corporation's donation of its then recently acquired $100-million, 85-acre (340,000 m2), fully equipped Gulf Oil Applied Research Center to the university in 1985.

In 2008, a $5.5-million overhaul of the 14th floor was completed and included the creation of new organic chemistry research laboratories. The first floor of Chevron has received a new electronic reference library and a new café The Bunsen Brewer. A $32.4 million 31,331 square-foot laboratory addition to Chevron, designed by Wilson Architects and Renaissance 3 Architects and constructed above Ashe Auditorium, was completed in 2011.

The building serves as the primary facility for the University of Pittsburgh's Department of Chemistry including its primary lecture halls, teaching laboratories, and research facilities for organic, inorganic, biological, analytical and physical chemistry; nanotechnology; alternative and renewable energy; and drug and transplant therapies.

Mural

A 1973  Virgil Cantini porcelain enamel mural entitled "Science and Mankind" is displayed Inside Chevron Science Center near its main auditoriums.  Depicting a man and woman with exposed skeletal and muscular systems touching hands, signifying the beginning of life, colors used on the figures represent different human cells with squares and triangles around them symbolize the birth of the computer age.  Measuring 40 by 30 feet, it is said to be the work Cantiini was most proud of.

Department of Chemistry

The department of chemistry, founded in 1875, is among the nation's largest undergraduate chemistry departments. It also has awarded more than 1,000 doctorate degrees and counts among its alumni Nobel Prize-winner Paul Lauterbur, who helped develop magnetic resonance imaging (MRI). Other alumni and researchers in the department have made important discoveries in fields like recombinant DNA technology, nanotechnology, and alternative fuels, and have pioneered innovative drug and transplant therapies.

References

External links
Chevron Science Center on Pitt's virtual Campus Tour
Chevron Annex on Pitt's virtual Campus Tour
Pitt Department of Chemistry

University of Pittsburgh academic buildings
University and college laboratories in the United States
Skyscrapers in Pittsburgh
Office buildings completed in 1974
Office buildings in Pittsburgh
1974 establishments in Pennsylvania